Shulgino is a rural locality (a village) in Asovskoye Rural Settlement, Beryozovsky District, Perm Krai, Russia. The population was 65 as of 2010. There are  streets.

Geography 
Shulgino is located 23 km southeast of  Beryozovka, the district's administrative centre, by road. Boronduki is the nearest rural locality.

References 

Rural localities in Beryozovsky District, Perm Krai